The High Speed Rail Corporation of India Limited (HSRCIL) is a Special Purpose Vehicle (SPV) which has been incorporated in 2012 as a subsidiary of Rail Vikas Nigam Limited (RVNL), a public sector enterprise of the Government of India. The HSRCIL has been formed under the Ministry of Railways, Government of India, for the development and implementation of the high speed rail projects in India.

Projects

Mumbai–Ahmedabad high-speed rail corridor

The corridor is being implemented by the National High Speed Rail Corporation Limited and the construction is expected to begin by April 2020 and the project is expected to be completed by December 2023. The corridor will use Japan Railways Shinkansen E5 Series electric multiple unit for its rolling stock.

Diamond Quadrilateral
As of 2020, contracts have been awarded for the feasibility studies for the Diamond Quadrilateral network. There will be 3 phases:

 Delhi-Mumbai 
 Mumbai-Chennai 
 Delhi-Kolkata

Delhi–Chandigarh–Amritsar high-speed rail corridor 
The pre-feasibility study of this high speed rail corridor is in progress. The interim report was submitted by Systra in 2015.

Delhi–Chennai 
This route will have 2 phases. The first phase, Delhi-Nagpur section is under feasibility study.

See also
 High-speed rail in India

References

External links
Official Website

2012 establishments in Delhi
Government-owned companies of India
Railway companies of India
High-speed rail in India
Organisations based in Delhi